Wolfgang Ernst Pauli (25 April 1900 – 15 December 1958) was an Austrian theoretical physicist and one of the pioneers of quantum physics. In 1945, after having been nominated by Albert Einstein, Pauli received the Nobel Prize in Physics for his "decisive contribution through his discovery of a new law of Nature, the exclusion principle or Pauli principle". The discovery involved spin theory, which is the basis of a theory of the structure of matter.

Early years 
Pauli was born in Vienna to a chemist, Wolfgang Joseph Pauli (né Wolf Pascheles, 1869–1955), and his wife, Bertha Camilla Schütz; his sister was Hertha Pauli, a writer and actress. Pauli's middle name was given in honor of his godfather, physicist Ernst Mach. Pauli's paternal grandparents were from prominent Jewish families of Prague; his great-grandfather was the Jewish publisher Wolf Pascheles. Pauli's mother, Bertha Schütz, was raised in her mother's Roman Catholic religion; her father was Jewish writer Friedrich Schütz. Pauli was raised as a Roman Catholic, although eventually he and his parents left the Church.

Pauli attended the Döblinger-Gymnasium in Vienna, graduating with distinction in 1918. Two months later, he published his first paper, on Albert Einstein's theory of general relativity. He attended the Ludwig-Maximilians University in Munich, working under Arnold Sommerfeld, where he received his PhD in July 1921 for his thesis on the quantum theory of ionized diatomic hydrogen.

Career 
Sommerfeld asked Pauli to review the theory of relativity for the Encyklopädie der mathematischen Wissenschaften (Encyclopedia of Mathematical Sciences). Two months after receiving his doctorate, Pauli completed the article, which came to 237 pages. Einstein praised it; published as a monograph, it remains a standard reference on the subject.

Pauli spent a year at the University of Göttingen as the assistant to Max Born, and the next year at the Institute for Theoretical Physics in Copenhagen (later the Niels Bohr Institute). From 1923 to 1928, he was a professor at the University of Hamburg. During this period, Pauli was instrumental in the development of the modern theory of quantum mechanics. In particular, he formulated the exclusion principle and the theory of nonrelativistic spin. He also wrote a paper on colloid chemistry and medicine in 1924.

In 1928, Pauli was appointed Professor of Theoretical Physics at ETH Zurich in Switzerland. He was awarded the Lorentz Medal in 1930. He held visiting professorships at the University of Michigan in 1931 and the Institute for Advanced Study in Princeton in 1935.

Jung
At the end of 1930, shortly after his postulation of the neutrino and immediately after his divorce and his mother's suicide, Pauli experienced a personal crisis. In January 1932 he consulted psychiatrist and psychotherapist Carl Jung, who also lived near Zurich. Jung immediately began interpreting Pauli's deeply archetypal dreams based on the I Ching, and Pauli became a collaborator of Jung's. He soon began to critique the epistemology of Jung's theory scientifically, and this contributed to a certain clarification of Jung's ideas, especially about synchronicity. A great many of these discussions are documented in the Pauli/Jung letters, today published as Atom and Archetype. Jung's elaborate analysis of more than 400 of Pauli's dreams is documented in Psychology and Alchemy. In 1933 Pauli published the second part of his book on Physics, Handbuch der Physik, which was considered the definitive book on the new field of quantum physics. Robert Oppenheimer called it "the only adult introduction to quantum mechanics."

The German annexation of Austria in 1938 made Pauli a German citizen, which became a problem for him in 1939 after World War II broke out. In 1940, he tried in vain to obtain Swiss citizenship, which would have allowed him to remain at the ETH.

United States
In 1940, Pauli moved to the United States, where he was employed as a professor of theoretical physics at the Institute for Advanced Study. In 1946, after the war, he became a naturalized U.S. citizen and returned to Zurich, where he mostly remained for the rest of his life. In 1949, he was granted Swiss citizenship.

In 1958, Pauli was awarded the Max Planck medal. The same year, he fell ill with pancreatic cancer. When his last assistant, Charles Enz, visited him at the Rotkreuz hospital in Zurich, Pauli asked him, "Did you see the room number?" It was 137. Throughout his life, Pauli had been preoccupied with the question of why the fine-structure constant, a dimensionless fundamental constant, has a value nearly equal to 1/137. Pauli died in that room on 15 December 1958.

Scientific research 

Pauli made many important contributions as a physicist, primarily in the field of quantum mechanics. He seldom published papers, preferring lengthy correspondences with colleagues such as Niels Bohr from the University of Copenhagen in Denmark and Werner Heisenberg, with whom he had close friendships. Many of his ideas and results were never published and appeared only in his letters, which were often copied and circulated by their recipients. In 1921 Pauli worked with Bohr to create the Aufbau Principle, which described building up electrons in shells based on the German word for building up, as Bohr was also fluent in German.

Pauli proposed in 1924 a new quantum degree of freedom (or quantum number) with two possible values, to resolve inconsistencies between observed molecular spectra and the developing theory of quantum mechanics. He formulated the Pauli exclusion principle, perhaps his most important work, which stated that no two electrons could exist in the same quantum state, identified by four quantum numbers including his new two-valued degree of freedom. The idea of spin originated with Ralph Kronig. A year later, George Uhlenbeck and Samuel Goudsmit identified Pauli's new degree of freedom as electron spin, in which Pauli for a very long time wrongly refused to believe.

In 1926, shortly after Heisenberg published the matrix theory of modern quantum mechanics, Pauli used it to derive the observed spectrum of the hydrogen atom. This result was important in securing credibility for Heisenberg's theory.

Pauli introduced the 2×2 Pauli matrices as a basis of spin operators, thus solving the nonrelativistic theory of spin. This work, including the Pauli equation, is sometimes said to have influenced Paul Dirac in his creation of the Dirac equation for the relativistic electron, though Dirac said that he invented these same matrices himself independently at the time. Dirac invented similar but larger (4x4) spin matrices for use in his relativistic treatment of fermionic spin.

In 1930, Pauli considered the problem of beta decay. In a letter of 4 December to Lise Meitner et al., beginning, "Dear radioactive ladies and gentlemen", he proposed the existence of a hitherto unobserved neutral particle with a small mass, no greater than 1% the mass of a proton, to explain the continuous spectrum of beta decay. In 1934, Enrico Fermi incorporated the particle, which he called a neutrino, "little neutral one" in Fermi's native Italian, into his theory of beta decay. The neutrino was first confirmed experimentally in 1956 by Frederick Reines and Clyde Cowan, two and a half years before Pauli's death. On receiving the news, he replied by telegram: "Thanks for message. Everything comes to him who knows how to wait. Pauli."

In 1940, Pauli re-derived the spin-statistics theorem, a critical result of quantum field theory that states that particles with half-integer spin are fermions, while particles with integer spin are bosons.

In 1949, he published a paper on Pauli–Villars regularization: regularization is the term for techniques that modify infinite mathematical integrals to make them finite during calculations, so that one can identify whether the intrinsically infinite quantities in the theory (mass, charge, wavefunction) form a finite and hence calculable set that can be redefined in terms of their experimental values, which criterion is termed renormalization, and which removes infinities from quantum field theories, but also importantly allows the calculation of higher-order corrections in perturbation theory.

Pauli made repeated criticisms of the modern synthesis of evolutionary biology, and his contemporary admirers point to modes of epigenetic inheritance as supporting his arguments.

Pauli was elected a Foreign Member of the Royal Society (ForMemRS) in 1953 and president of the Swiss Physical Society in 1955 for two years. In 1958 he became a foreign member of the Royal Netherlands Academy of Arts and Sciences.

Personality and friendships 

The Pauli effect was named after his anecdotal bizarre ability to break experimental equipment simply by being in its vicinity. Pauli was aware of his reputation and was delighted whenever the Pauli effect manifested. These strange occurrences were in line with his controversial investigations into the legitimacy of parapsychology, particularly his collaboration with C. G. Jung on synchronicity. Max Born considered Pauli "only comparable to Einstein himself... perhaps even greater". Einstein declared Pauli his "spiritual heir".

Pauli was famously a perfectionist. This extended not just to his own work, but also to that of his colleagues. As a result, he became known in the physics community as the "conscience of physics", the critic to whom his colleagues were accountable. He could be scathing in his dismissal of any theory he found lacking, often labelling it ganz falsch, "utterly wrong".

But this was not his most severe criticism, which he reserved for theories or theses so unclearly presented as to be untestable or unevaluatable and thus not properly belonging within the realm of science, even though posing as such. They were worse than wrong because they could not be proved wrong. Famously, he once said of such an unclear paper: "It is not even wrong!"

His supposed remark when meeting another leading physicist, Paul Ehrenfest, illustrates this notion of an arrogant Pauli. The two met at a conference for the first time. Ehrenfest was familiar with Pauli's papers and quite impressed with them. After a few minutes of conversation, Ehrenfest remarked, "I think I like your Encyclopedia article [on relativity theory] better than I like you," to which Pauli retorted, "That's strange. With me, regarding you, it is just the opposite." The two became very good friends from then on.

A somewhat warmer picture emerges from this story, which appears in the article on Dirac:

Werner Heisenberg [in Physics and Beyond, 1971] recollects a friendly conversation among young participants at the 1927 Solvay Conference, about Einstein and Planck's views on religion. Wolfgang Pauli, Heisenberg, and Dirac took part in it. Dirac's contribution was a poignant and clear criticism of the political manipulation of religion, that was much appreciated for its lucidity by Bohr, when Heisenberg reported it to him later. Among other things, Dirac said: "I cannot understand why we idle discussing religion. If we are honest – and as scientists honesty is our precise duty – we cannot help but admit that any religion is a pack of false statements, deprived of any real foundation. The very idea of God is a product of human imagination. [ ... ] I do not recognize any religious myth, at least because they contradict one another. [ ... ]" Heisenberg's view was tolerant. Pauli had kept silent, after some initial remarks. But when finally he was asked for his opinion, jokingly he said: "Well, I'd say that also our friend Dirac has got a religion and the first commandment of this religion is 'God does not exist and Paul Dirac is his prophet'". Everybody burst into laughter, including Dirac.

Many of Pauli's ideas and results were never published and appeared only in his letters, which were often copied and circulated by their recipients. Pauli may have been unconcerned that much of his work thus went uncredited, but when it came to Heisenberg's world-renowned 1958 lecture at Göttingen on their joint work on a unified field theory, and the press release calling Pauli a mere "assistant to Professor Heisenberg", Pauli became offended, denouncing Heisenberg's physics prowess. The deterioration of their relationship resulted in Heisenberg ignoring Pauli's funeral, and writing in his autobiography that Pauli's criticisms were overwrought, though ultimately the field theory was proved untenable, validating Pauli's criticisms.

Philosophy 
In his discussions with Carl Jung, Pauli developed an ontological theory that has been dubbed the "Pauli–Jung Conjecture" and has been seen a kind of dual-aspect theory. The theory holds that there is "a psychophysically neutral reality" and that mental and physical aspects are derivative of this reality. Pauli thought that elements of quantum physics pointed to a deeper reality that might explain the mind/matter gap and wrote, "we must postulate a cosmic order of nature beyond our control to which both the outward material objects and the inward images are subject."

Pauli and Jung held that this reality was governed by common principles ("archetypes") that appear as psychological phenomena or as physical events. They also held that synchronicities might reveal some of this underlying reality's workings.

Beliefs
He is considered to have been a deist and a mystic. In No Time to Be Brief: A Scientific Biography of Wolfgang Pauli he is quoted as writing to science historian Shmuel Sambursky, "In opposition to the monotheist religions – but in unison with the mysticism of all peoples, including the Jewish mysticism – I believe that the ultimate reality is not personal."

Personal life 

In 1929, Pauli married Käthe Margarethe Deppner, a cabaret dancer. The marriage was unhappy, ending in divorce after less than a year. He married again in 1934 to Franziska Bertram (1901–1987). They had no children.

Death
Pauli died of pancreatic cancer on December 15, 1958, at age 58.

Bibliography

References

Further reading 
 
 
 
 
 
 
 
 
 
 
 
 
 
 Remo, F. Roth: Return of the World Soul, Wolfgang Pauli, C.G. Jung and the Challenge of Psychophysical Reality [unus mundus], Part 1: The Battle of the Giants. Pari Publishing, 2011, .
 Remo, F. Roth: Return of the World Soul, Wolfgang Pauli, C.G. Jung and the Challenge of Psychophysical Reality [unus mundus], Part 2: A Psychophysical Theory. Pari Publishing, 2012, .

External links 

 
 
 Pauli bio at the University of St Andrews, Scotland
 Wolfgang Pauli bio at "Nobel Prize Winners"
 Wolfgang Pauli, Carl Jung and Marie-Louise von Franz
 Virtual walk-through exhibition of the life and times of Pauli
 Annotated bibliography for Wolfgang Pauli from the Alsos Digital Library for Nuclear Issues
 Pauli Archives at CERN Document Server
 Virtual exhibition at ETH-Bibliothek, Zurich
 Key Participants: Wolfgang Pauli – Linus Pauling and the Nature of the Chemical Bond: A Documentary History
 Pauli's letter (December 1930), the hypothesis of the neutrino (online and analyzed, for English version click 'Télécharger')
 Pauli exclusion principle with Melvyn Bragg, Frank Close, Michela Massimi, Graham Farmelo "In Our Time 6 April 2017"

1900 births
1958 deaths
Nobel laureates in Physics
Austrian Nobel laureates
Austro-Hungarian Nobel laureates
20th-century Austrian physicists
Jewish emigrants from Austria to the United States after the Anschluss
Deaths from cancer in Switzerland
Deaths from pancreatic cancer
Academic staff of ETH Zurich
Foreign Members of the Royal Society
Institute for Advanced Study visiting scholars
Jewish American physicists
Jewish physicists
Members of the Royal Netherlands Academy of Arts and Sciences
Naturalised citizens of Switzerland
Lorentz Medal winners
Quantum physicists
Scientists from Vienna
Theoretical physicists
Thermodynamicists
Academic staff of the University of Göttingen
Winners of the Max Planck Medal
Carl Jung
Recipients of the Matteucci Medal
Swiss Nobel laureates
Members of the Royal Swedish Academy of Sciences
Academic staff of the University of Hamburg